Phylliscidium is a genus of lichenized fungi in the family Lichinaceae. It is monotypic, containing the single species Phylliscidium monophyllum.

References

External links
Index Fungorum

Lichinomycetes
Lichen genera
Monotypic Ascomycota genera